The Seaboard Air Line Lounge Car-6603 is a historic Seaboard Air Line Railroad passenger car in Boca Raton, Florida. It is located at 747 South Dixie Highway, off U.S. 1, part of the restored Florida East Coast Railway Passenger Station. On April 5, 2001, it was added to the U.S. National Register of Historic Places. It was originally built by the Budd Company in 1947.

References

External links
 
 All aboard for South Florida's best train adventures at SouthFlorida.com

National Register of Historic Places in Palm Beach County, Florida
Seaboard Air Line Railroad
Boca Raton, Florida
Budd Company
Rail passenger cars of the United States